The 1923 Yale Bulldogs football team represented Yale University in the 1923 college football season. The Bulldogs finished with an undefeated 8–0 record under sixth-year head coach Tad Jones.  Yale outscored its opponents by a combined score of 230 to 38, including a 40–0 victory over Georgia, a 31–10 victory over Army and shutout victories over rivals Princeton and Harvard.  Two Yale players, tackle Century Milstead and fullback Bill Mallory, were consensus selections for the 1923 College Football All-America Team. The team was selected retroactively as a co-national champion by the Berryman QPRS system.

Schedule

References

Yale
Yale Bulldogs football seasons
College football undefeated seasons
Yale Bulldogs football